Emily Chester was an American novel written by Anne Moncure Crane in 1864. It was published without a word of preface to give the least hint of the whereabouts of the author, and was not covered with the pall of a Great Southern Novel! as was usually the mode novels by Southern writers were announced. It had made a reputation in Boston before it was announced that the author was a lady of Baltimore.

Background
In 1858, when Crane was 20, she competed with a number of her friends to see who could write the best novel. The result of the friendly competition was the work that would set Crane upon her distinguished path – the novel Emily Chester. When the novel was completed, it was taken to Messrs. Ticknor & Fields, Boston, by a writer who was a stranger to them. She was told that they could not even entertain the idea of publishing it, as they were overcrowded with previous engagements; but upon her urging the point, she was politely allowed to leave the book for inspection. Within two weeks from that time they sent a contract for its publication, addressed to the "Author of 'Emily Chester; and it was not until Crane returned the paper signed in full that they knew the name of the writer whose novel they had bound themselves to publish. Nevertheless, the first edition was published anonymously. On the title page is a quotation from Goethe, "It is in her monstrosities that Nature discloses to us her secrets."

From the first, the book attained success. The publishers were scarcely able to supply the demand. More than this, four editions were issued by leading English publishers and the story was translated into German, meeting a cordial reception in the cultured and appreciative circles of the European world. The novel was dramatized by George H. Miles and won new fame by presentation upon the stage, exceeding the most sanguine hopes of the author as well as the adapter. The entire chorus of reviewers, including names of eminence, were enthusiastic and almost untempered in their praise. Probably no book ever written by a Maryland woman met with speedier and more marked success. To a certain extent the work was autobiographical in character, it being an article in Miss Crane's literary creed that a novel is effective just in so far as the elements of autobiography enters into its creation.

Plot
The opening scenes of this book, and some that are most interesting, are placed in Maryland. At the heart of the work was the dilemma of the title character, who married a respectable, if boring, middle class gentleman, and later fell in love with a more dashing man of her community. The fierce moral debate that subsequently raged inside Emily - whether to stay faithful to her husband, or to pursue her passion for her real love - eventually had a deleterious effect on her physical health. A conclusion came about, morbidly, with Emily's death.

Characters
It has been said that the characters are drawn from life. Whether they be drawn from individual lives or otherwise, they are delineated with a bold and masterly hand, equal to the task. In "Emily Chester," the author is said to have idealized herself. "Certainly," said a friend of that writer, "the glorious hair that crowned the head of Emily Chester belonged to Anne Crane."

Critical reception
"New and Original Novel" was the heading of an article in the Boston Transcript, written by Edwin Percy Whipple, the essayist, in which he says:—

The Hon. George H. Hilliard reviewed the book thus:—

To show the attention this novel attracted among the intellectual portion of the North, the following was a criticism from "Gail Hamilton" of New England:—

Adaptations
In Henry James and the "Woman Business" (2004), writer Alfred Habegger accuses Henry James of plagiarizing Crane's novels after her death and rewriting them under his own name. He believes that a scathing anonymous obituary was in fact written by James who had every reason, he contends, to want her forgotten:—

Notes

References

Citations

Attribution

Bibliography

1864 American novels
Literature by women